Willis Branch is a  long 2nd order tributary to the Leipsic River in Kent County, Delaware.

Course
Willis Branch rises in a pond on the Fork Branch divide about 0.5 miles east of Seven Hickories, Delaware.

Watershed
Willis Branch drains  of area, receives about 45.0 in/year of precipitation, has a topographic wetness index of 557.46 and is about 8.0% forested.

See also
List of rivers of Delaware

References 

Rivers of Delaware
Rivers of Kent County, Delaware
Tributaries of the Leipsic River